ultrAslan is a football firm associated with Galatasaray S.K.

The firm was founded on 20 January 2001, after various smaller groups of fans decided that, Galatasaray, which could be seen as a European top club after their success in the 1999–2000 UEFA Cup and 2000 UEFA Super Cup, needed a large, organised fan group. This led to the creation of ultrAslan under the leadership of Alpaslan Dikmen, the main coordinator until his accidental death on 27 September 2008. The name of the organisation is a portmanteau word combining the concepts of "Ultras" and "Aslan" (the lion).

ultrAslan are renowned for their creative choreography and use of flares. After a derby match against Fenerbahçe S.K. was interrupted due to the use of over 3000 flares, the use of flares was completely forbidden in the Turkish leagues, with the introduction of stiff fines for offenses.

In contrast to many other European fan groups, ultrAslan, although patriotic, is generally had the apolitical in nature. It is quite critical of the club management, and has a major influence on the transfer policy of the club. It strictly declines any financial support or supply of free tickets from the club, and is financed by donations by members as well as by the sale of self-produced articles. Similarly to other Ultra-groups in Europe, they oppose the commercialisation of football.

External links
 Official website

References

Galatasaray S.K.
Association football hooligan firms
Gangs in Turkey
2001 establishments in Turkey